Eleutherodactylus saxatilis is a species of frog in the family Eleutherodactylidae.
It is endemic to Mexico.
Its natural habitats are subtropical or tropical moist lowland forests and rocky areas.
It is threatened by habitat loss.

References

saxatilis
Amphibians described in 1962
Taxonomy articles created by Polbot